Paint Township may refer to the following polaces in the United States:

Ohio 
Paint Township, Fayette County, Ohio
Paint Township, Highland County, Ohio
Paint Township, Holmes County, Ohio
Paint Township, Madison County, Ohio
Paint Township, Ross County, Ohio
Paint Township, Wayne County, Ohio

Pennsylvania 
Paint Township, Clarion County, Pennsylvania
Paint Township, Somerset County, Pennsylvania

Township name disambiguation pages